A wound is a type of injury.

Wound may also refer to:

Arts, entertainment, and media
 Wound (album), a 1991 album by Autopsia
 Wound, a 1992 extended play by Buzzov•en
 The Wound (1998 film), a Turkish film
 The Wound (2017 film), a South African film
 The Wounds, a 1998 Serbian  drama film
 Wounds (film), a 2019 American psychological horror film

Other uses
 Wound (law), a legal term
Narcissistic wound, a repeated or recurrent threat that is either identical or similar to a narcissist's grandiose self-perception
Winding (disambiguation)

See also
Wounded (disambiguation)